The Alvin Ailey American Dance Theater (AAADT) is a modern dance company based in New York City. It was founded in 1958 by choreographer and dancer Alvin Ailey. It is made up of 32 dancers, led by artistic director Robert Battle and associate artistic director Matthew Rushing.

History
Alvin Ailey and a group of young Black modern dancers first performed at New York's 92nd Street Young Men's Hebrew Association (92nd Street Y), under the name Alvin Ailey American Dance Theater (AAADT), in March 1958. Ailey was the company's director, choreographer, and principal dancer. The company started as an ensemble of only seven dancers, plus their choreographer, and many guest choreographers.

Following their first performance, which included Ailey's Blues Suite, the company traveled on what were known as the "station wagon tours"; in 1960, the AAADT became a resident company of the 51st Street YWCA's Clark Center for the Performing Arts. During this period Ailey choreographed his famous work Revelations, a character dance done to traditional music. In 1962, Ailey changed his all-black dance company into a multi-racial group. In that same year, the company was chosen to tour the Far East, Southeast Asia and Australia as part of President John F. Kennedy's "President's Special International Program for Cultural Presentations". AAADT was the first "Black" company to travel for Kennedy's program.  

In 1960, James Truitte joined the dance company, and later became an authority on Horton's technique.

Judith Jamison, a star of the company for 15 years, joined the company in 1965.  

Ailey established a school in 1969, the same year that the company moved to the Brooklyn Academy of Music. Both company and school relocated to 229 East 59th Street in Manhattan a year later, to a renovated church building. In April of that year, a financial crisis caused Ailey to issue a statement that the dissolution of the company might take place. The crisis abated, however, and in 1971 AAADT made its first performance at the New York City Center, where it is currently the resident company.  

AAADT, the Alvin Ailey Repertory Ensemble (later renamed Ailey II), and the Alvin Ailey American Dance Center (later renamed The Ailey School) relocated in 1980 to four new studios in a building on Broadway. The company celebrated its 25th anniversary three years later.

Alvin Ailey died on December 1, 1989; before his death he selected Judith Jamison to succeed him as artistic director, and the entire Ailey organization moved to 211 West 61st Street on the Upper West Side of Manhattan. The Ailey School and nearby Fordham College at Lincoln Center (FCLC), Fordham University, have since affiliated to offer a Bachelor of Fine Arts (BFA) degree program.

Following tours in Russia, France and Cuba in the 1990s, as well as a residency in South Africa in 1997, the Alvin Ailey Dance Foundation announced in 2001 that a new dance complex was to be developed. Ground was broken on the building site in Manhattan the following year. The company and school moved into the building, named the Joan Weill Center for Dance, in 2004.

Governance
The Ailey School is an accredited institutional member of the National Association of Schools of Dance (NASD). The school is recognized by the U.S. Department of Education as an institution of higher education and is eligible to participate in Title IV programs. It is recognized by the US Veterans Administration as eligible to participate in Veteran's Educational Benefit Programs. The Ailey School is authorized under federal law to enroll non-immigrant alien students.

People
Many people have contributed to the success of AAADT, but the work of Michael Kaiser, the executive director from 1990 to 1993, is often cited as a model of successful nonprofit performing arts management.

Masazumi Chaya, who later served as associate artistic director for 28 years, first joined the company as a dancer in 1972.  

After 21 seasons (since 1989), Jamison personally selected Robert Battle to succeed her as Ailey's artistic director in 2011, and The New York Times declared he "has injected the company with new life."

Troy Powell became artistic director of Ailey II in 2012, succeeding artistic director emerita Sylvia Waters, who ran the junior company for its first 38 years. Powell was fired in 2020 after allegations of sexual misconduct involving students and other young dancers surfaced online. Francesca Harper, daughter of former school director Denise Jefferson, was appointed director of Ailey II in 2021. 

Denise Jefferson was selected by Ailey to head the school when it was founded in 1984, and served as its director until her death in 2010.

The Ailey School's current co-directors are Tracy Inman and Melanie Person.

Performances and repertory
The Alvin Ailey American Dance Theater has performed for an estimated 25 million people in 48 states, as well as 71 countries on six continents. Among these performances are included two South African residencies. The company has often been an ambassador for American culture, starting with President John F. Kennedy's Southeast Asia tour program. The troupe toured southeast Asia and Australia in 1962, and performed in the International Arts Festival in Rio de Janeiro, Brazil, in 1963. They performed at the first World Festival of Negro Arts in Dakar, Senegal, in 1966. In 1968, AAADT performed at the Edinburgh Festival, earning awards for "best choreographer", and "best company". They were also awarded "best male dancer" at the International Dance Festival in Paris in 1970, the same year that they did a six-city tour of the USSR. The company and its dancers and artistic staff have been recognized as cultural ambassadors numerous times, as in the 2001 awarding of the National Medal of Arts to both Judith Jamison and the Alvin Ailey Dance Foundation. In 2008, the United States Congress passed a resolution officially designating the company a "vital American Cultural Ambassador to the World."

Founder Alvin Ailey created more than 79 dances for his company during his tenure; he also maintained, however, that the company was not solely a repository for his choreography. Hence AAADT has a repertory of more than 235 works by more than 90 choreographers, including Ulysses Dove, Karole Armitage, George Faison, Uri Sands, Elisa Monte, Talley Beatty, Katherine Dunham, Donald Byrd, and Twyla Tharp (whose work The Golden Section, excerpted from her larger ballet, The Catherine Wheel, entered AAADT's repertory in 2006). The company's popularity comes from its theatrical, extroverted style of dancers with strong personalities and muscular skill. Yet the majority of AAADT's pieces have not held the stage for more than a few seasons, and comparatively few have managed to reach critical acclaim. However, the company keeps Alvin Ailey's works, including Revelations (1960), Night Creature (1974) and Cry (1971), in continuous performance. Memoria was one of Alvin Ailey's balletic pieces, with long lines and a clear technical style different from his usual jazz character style of swirling patters, strong, driving arm movements, huge jumps, and thrusting steps. This dance was later adopted into the repertory of the Royal Danish Ballet. Cry is a three-part, 17-minute solo created for Judith Jamison. It was meant to pay homage to "all Black women everywhere, especially our mothers" and can be seen as a journey from degradation to pride, defiance, and survival. Cry has great physical and emotional demands on both performer and audience.

Battle has expanded the company's repertory in significant ways, adding works by established choreographers such as Garth Fagan, Jiri Kylian, Wayne McGregor, Ohad Naharin and Paul Taylor, and commissioning new dances from contemporary choreographers including Kyle Abraham and Aszure Barton. In 2011, Battle also established a New Directions Choreography Lab to nurture emerging artists.

See also
Culture of New York City
Carmen De Lavallade
Mel Tomlinson
Masazumi Chaya
Keith McDaniel

References

External links

 Alvin Ailey American Dance Theater website
 Repertory of the Company
 History and Timeline of the Company
 Alvin Ailey American Dance Theater Channel on YouTube
 Fordham University Bachelor of Fine Arts degree program affiliation
Archival footage of Matthew Rushing performing in Alvin Ailey's Revelations in 2007 at Jacob’s Pillow Dance Festival
Archival footage of Ailey II performing in Alvin Ailey's Revelations in 1988 at Jacob's Pillow Dance Festival
 
 Map: 

1958 establishments in New York City
African-American culture
African-American dance
Dance companies in New York City
Modern dance companies
United States National Medal of Arts recipients